The base stock model is a statistical model in inventory theory. In this model inventory is refilled one unit at a time and demand is random. If there is only one replenishment, then the problem can be solved with the newsvendor model.

Overview

Assumptions

 Products can be analyzed individually
 Demands occur one at a time (no batch orders)
 Unfilled demand is back-ordered (no lost sales)
 Replenishment lead times are fixed and known
 Replenishments are ordered one at a time
 Demand is modeled by a continuous probability distribution

Variables

 = Replenishment lead time
 = Demand during replenishment lead time
 = probability density function of demand during lead time
 = cumulative distribution function of demand during lead time
 = mean demand during lead time
 = cost to carry one unit of inventory for 1 year
 = cost to carry one unit of back-order for 1 year
 = reorder point
, safety stock level
 = fill rate
 = average number of outstanding back-orders
 = average on-hand inventory level

Fill rate, back-order level and inventory level

In a base-stock system inventory position is given by on-hand inventory-backorders+orders and since inventory never goes negative, inventory position=r+1. Once an order is placed the base stock level is r+1 and if X≤r+1 there won't be a backorder. The probability that an order does not result in back-order is therefore:

Since this holds for all orders, the fill rate is:

If demand is normally distributed , the fill rate is given by:

Where  is cumulative distribution function for the standard normal. At any point in time, there are orders placed that are equal to the demand X that has occurred, therefore on-hand inventory-backorders=inventory position-orders=r+1-X. In expectation this means:

In general the number of outstanding orders is X=x and the number of back-orders is:

The expected back order level is therefore given by:

Again, if demand is normally distributed:

Where  is the inverse distribution function of a standard normal distribution.

Total cost function and optimal reorder point

The total cost is given by the sum of holdings costs and backorders costs:

It can be proven that:

Where r* is the optimal reorder point.

{| class="toccolours collapsible collapsed" width="90%" style="text-align:left"
!Proof
|-
|

To minimize TC set the first derivative equal to zero:

And solve for G(r+1).
|}

If demand is normal then r* can be obtained by:

See also

 Infinite fill rate for the part being produced: Economic order quantity
 Constant fill rate for the part being produced: Economic production quantity
 Demand is random: classical Newsvendor model
 Continuous replenishment with backorders: (Q,r) model
 Demand varies deterministically over time: Dynamic lot size model
 Several products produced on the same machine: Economic lot scheduling problem

References

Inventory optimization